Bodești is a commune in Neamț County, Western Moldavia, Romania. It is composed of four villages: Bodești, Bodeștii de Jos, Corni and Oșlobeni.

References

Communes in Neamț County
Localities in Western Moldavia